Curly sedge is a common name for several plants and may refer to:
 Carex rupestris, native to Asia, Europe, and North America
 Caustis recurvata, native to Australia